Chris Friel may refer to:

 Chris Friel (politician), politician in the Canadian province of Ontario
 Chris Friel (photographer) (born 1959), British photographer